Alfred Roger Adam (4 April 1908 – 7 May 1982) was a French stage and film character actor, who usually played weak or villainous roles.

Selected filmography

Speedway (1929) - Doctor (uncredited)
La Kermesse Héroïque (1935) - Josef Van Meulen, le boucher
Au service du Tsar (1936) - Ossip
Life Dances On (1937) - Fred
People Who Travel (1938) - Le médecin (uncredited)
La Glu (1938) - Raoul
Je chante... (1938) - Alfred
La Famille Duraton (1939) - Le docteur
Sur le Plancher des Vaches (1940) - Le journaliste (uncredited)
Le briseur de chaînes (1941) - Guillaume
La femme que j'ai le plus aimée (1942) - Charles, le fondé de pouvoir
Croisières sidérales (1942) - Le décorateur (uncredited)
 At Your Command, Madame (1942) - Ferdinand - le chauffeur de Palureau
Port d'attache (1943) - Bertrand
Farandole (1945) - Le marlou
Boule de Suif (1945) - Cornudet
La Vie de Bohème (1945m) - Alexandre Schaunard
La Ferme du Pendu (1945) - Louis Raimondeau dit 'Grand Louis'
Le Bateau à soupe (1946) - Le Hénaff
 The Fugitive (1947) - Bank
Chinese Quarter (1947) - Léo Seller
Les beaux jours du roi Murat (1947) - Le roi Murat
The Lost Village (1947) - Gustave Boeuf
 Woman Without a Past (1948) - Pierre Lorin
Passeurs d'or (1948) - Gueule en or
Jo la Romance (1949) - Stoff
L'homme aux mains d'argile (1949) - Lucien Roupp dit Monsieur Lucien - le manager
The Farm of Seven Sins (1949) - Symphorien Dubois
Le sorcier du ciel (1949) - Samson
 The King (1949) - Bourdier
My Friend Sainfoin (1950) - Guillaume de Puycharmois - le mari d'Eugénie
The Straw Lover (1950) - Gaston Sarrazin de Fontenoy
 Darling Caroline (1951) - Jules, le postillon
My Wife Is Formidable (1951) - Dr. Gaston Rival
Ouvert contre X... (1952) - Le vendeur de boutons (uncredited)
Capitaine Pantoufle (1953)
The Fighting Drummer (1953) - Favrol
The Drunkard (1953) - Georges Lamarche
The Most Wanted Man (1953) - Le shérif
Il cavaliere di Maison Rouge (1954) - Dixmaire
 Service Entrance (1954) - Le cousin Albert
 Cadet Rousselle (1954) - Ravignol
Caroline and the Rebels (1955) - Le général de Lasalle
La Famille Anodin (1956) - Armand Vignaud
Les Sorcières de Salem (1957) - Thomas Putnam
A Kiss for a Killer (1957) - L'inspecteur de police Malard
Maigret Sets a Trap (1958) - Emile Barberot - le boucher (uncredited)
The Tiger Attacks (1959) - Le colonel - chef de la D.S.T.
Les Naufrageurs (1959) - Le commissaire
Le gendarme de Champignol (1959) - M. Grégoire 'Grégorio' - le maire
125 rue Montmartre (1959) - Phillipe Barrachet
Rue des prairies (1960) - Loutrel le manager de Louis
La main chaude (1960) - Jean Lécuyer
 Women Are Like That (1960) - Pascal Girotti
Love and the Frenchwoman (1960) - Judge (segment "Divorce, Le")
Le Président (1961) - François - le chauffeur
La Belle Américaine (1961) - Alfred
All the Gold in the World (1961) - Alfred
My Life to Live (1962) - (uncredited)
Tartarin de Tarascon (1962) - Prince Gregori de Montenegro
Carom Shots (1963) - Hubert Beaumanoir
Mort, où est ta victoire? (1964) - Detrerrieux
Anatomy of a Marriage: My Days with Jean-Marc (1964) - Fernand Aubry
Anatomy of a Marriage: My Days with Françoise (1964) - Fernand Aubry
The Lace Wars (1965) - Le sergent Bel-Oeil
Le caïd de Champignol (1966) - Antoine
The Gardener of Argenteuil (1966) - L'homme en robe de bure
Maigret a Pigalle (1966) - L'ispettore Lognon
The Stranger (1967) - L'avocat général
How to Kill 400 Duponts (1967) - Serg. Saval
 A Little Virtuous (1968) - Marcel dit 'Lajoie' - l'homme du bar
 Under the Sign of the Bull (1969) - Vacher - le ferrailleur
Mon oncle Benjamin (1969) - Le sergent
Le Prussien (1971, TV Movie) - Victor
Ursule et Grelu (1974) - Le capitaine
 Juliette and Juliette (1974) - M. Rozenec - le père d'une Juliettte
Que la fête commence (1975) - Le maréchal de Villeroy
The Porter from Maxim's (1976) - Le patron de chez Maxim's
Nous maigrirons ensemble (1979) - Le producteur Blangenstein

References

External links

1908 births
1982 deaths
French male film actors
Troupe of the Comédie-Française
20th-century French male actors